The Aloha Classic is touted as "the single most prestigious event in the windsurfing world".  Held at Ho'okipa Beach Park on the north shore of Maui, this event enjoys outstanding wave riding conditions showcasing the best wave riders from all over the world. The event takes place each year in late October and early November for the best wind and wave conditions and it is common to have 15–20 foot wave faces during the contest. Since 2011 the event has been run by the International Windsurfing Tour (IWT) as the Grand Final of The IWT Wave Tour. The IWT is the Hawaiian based organisation for the wave riders of the Asia Pacific hemisphere. The Aloha Classic has often been the final event of the Professional Windsurfers Association (PWA) crowning the PWA Wave World Champions.

During the 1980s and 1990s The Aloha Classic was a Grand Slam event offering competition in all three of the Professional Boardsailing Association PBA/PWA windsurfing disciplines: wave riding, slalom (windsurf)|slalom and course racing.

Due to the difficulty of raising high levels of prize money through sponsorship, the event could not always offer all disciplines or get the status of an official PWA World Cup. Since 2011, the contest has focused entirely on radical wave riding.

During the 1990s, a second competition was regularly held in Ho'okipa, known as the Maui Invitational.  1994-1995 there was a third competition, known as the Chiemsee World Cup Maui.

With eight victories at these various Hookipa events, Robby Naish is the most successful competitor in the wave contests at Ho'okipa, followed by Jason Polakow (4), Mark Angulo (3) Morgan Noireaux (3).  For the women, Angela Cocheran (7) is the best performer in history with seven victories in wave riding, ahead of Iballa Ruano Moreno (4) and Debbie Brown (3). (Status of 2020)

List of winners 
Competitions shaded grey were not counted as windsurf world cup.

Maui Invitational 

In contrast to the Aloha Classic, the Maui Invitational takes part in spring time, when the trade winds are more reliable.  This event was most of the time sponsored by the wet suit brand O'Neill.

Chiemsee Worldcup Maui 

At the heights of the windsurfing boom a third Worldcup took place at Ho'okipa, the Chiemsee Worldcup Maui. It took the time slot of the Maui Invitational, which in exchange was move to early summer.

References 

Windsurfing
1984 establishments in Hawaii
Recurring sporting events established in 1984